Alone.  is the second studio album by Australian neo-psychedelia band The Morning After Girls.

"Alone" was released as a free download on Spinner.com.

Track listing

Critical reception 

The Mercury called Alone.  "skilful, intricate and drenched in grandeur".

References

External links 

 

2011 albums
The Morning After Girls albums